Chu Kong Passenger Transport Co., Ltd. (CKPT) is a subsidiary of Chu Kong Shipping Enterprises (CKS) and operates ferry services between Hong Kong and cities in Guangdong province, China, as well as Macau.

It is headquartered in the Chu Kong Shipping Tower (珠江船務大廈) in Central, Hong Kong. 

CKS has been assigned the two-letter airline code 3A by IATA, used for routes to/from Hong Kong International Airport only, where passengers must continue to other destinations (or vice versa) by air.

History

The company was established in Hong Kong in July 1985 and is the subsidiary of Hong Kong Chu Kong Shipping Enterprises (Holdings) Company Limited.

Routes and ports

Terminals in Hong Kong:

 Hong Kong China Ferry Terminal (中港城碼頭)
 Hong Kong–Macau Ferry Terminal (港澳碼頭)
 Skypier at Hong Kong International Airport (海天碼頭)

Ports and terminals have full customs and immigration desks, as well as ticket offices. The ports served by CKS outside of Hong Kong include:
 Macau:
 Outer Harbour Ferry Terminal
 Taipa Temporary Ferry Terminal
 Doumen (斗門), Zhuhai
 Fuyong next to Shenzhen Bao'an International Airport - Fuyong Ferry Terminal
 Gaoming (高明), Foshan
 Gongyi, Taishan (台山公益)
 Heshan (鶴山), Jiangmen
 Humen (虎門), Dongguan - Humen Ferry Terminal
 Jiangmen (江門)
 Lianhuashan, Panyu (番禺蓮花山), Guangzhou
 Nanhai, Foshan
 Sanbu, Kaiping (開平三埠), Jiangmen
 Shekou (蛇口), Shenzhen - Shekou Passenger Terminal
 Shunde (順德), Foshan - Shunde Port
 Xinhui, Jiangmen
 Xintang, Zengcheng, Guangzhou
 Zhaoqing. Transfer by bus at the port in Gaoming
 Zhongshan (中山)
 Jiuzhou Port, Zhuhai (珠海九洲港)

Fleet

The CKS fleet consists of catamarans built in Australia and China. Most ships are registered in China:

 Hai Kun: 352 passenger ex-Zhao-Qing delivered in 1997 by Austal Ships of Australia.
 Hai Liang (海亮)
 Hai Chi (海弛)
 Hai Zhu (海珠)
 Hai Yang (海洋)
 Hai Bin (海濱)
 Hai Chang (海昌)
 Qi Jiang (岐江)
 Zhong Shan (中山)
 Yi Xian Hu (逸仙湖)
 Xing Zhong (興中)
 Cui Heng Hu (翠亨湖)
 Shun Dei (順德)
 Shun Feng (順風)
 Shun Shui (順水)
 Shun Jing (順景)
 Lian Shan Hu (蓮山湖)
 Lian Gang Hu (蓮港湖)
 Peng Lai Hu (蓬萊湖)
 Peng Xing (鵬星)
 Wu Yi Hu (五邑湖)
 Tai Jian (太建)
 Dong Tai An (東太安)
 Dong Fang Chun (東方春)
 Gang Zhou (岡州)
 Xin He Shan (新鶴山)
 Tai Shan (台山)

See also
 Transport in Hong Kong
 List of companies of China

References

External links

 Company's website

Ferry transport in Hong Kong
Shipping companies of Hong Kong
Privately held companies of China
Transport companies established in 1985
1985 establishments in Hong Kong